Vastadu Naa Raju (English: My King will Arrive) is a 2011 Indian Telugu-language action film directed by Hemant Madhukar. It stars Vishnu Manchu, who has also produced the film and Taapsee Pannu in the lead roles. While Gopal Reddy S has handled the camera, the music is composed by Mani Sharma. The film released in February 2011.

Plot
Narasimha (Prakash Raj) is a rowdy whose life ambition is to become an MLA. He murders people and works as a henchman to the Home Minister (Sayaji Shinde) in hopes of getting the seat. However, Narasimha has a sister Pooja (Taapsee Pannu), whom he adores a lot. and she too loves her brother.

Venky (Vishnu Manchu) is a happy-go-lucky guy with a nice family and no problems. His ambition in life is to become a professional kickboxer. He and his dad share a strong bond. When Venky goes to the shop to pick up his pictures, he accidentally takes the wrong envelope. His family sees the pictures of Pooja and thinks she is Venky's girlfriend.

The Home Minister's son Ajay (Ajay) wants to marry Pooja and tells Narasimha that he will make him an MLA if he agrees to the marriage. Narasimha quickly agrees, and Pooja too has no objection to her brother's decision. Through a series of misunderstandings, Narasimha thinks that Pooja is in love with Venky, though they both have never met. Narasimha worries that he will not become a MLA, and goes to Venky's family's coffee shop and thrashes everything. He destroys Venky's sister's marriage and slaps Venky's father. Venky comes home and sees the destruction. He's confused and swears revenge on Narasimha.

Narasimha screams at Pooja and she decides to commit suicide; when she jumps into the water, Venky saves her. It is late, so he decides to drop her at her home. When Narasimha sees Pooja on Venky's bike, he thinks that they are eloping. Venky and Pooja try to explain that they don't know each other and it is a misunderstanding, but Narasimha won't listen. A fight follows. and Narasimha shoots Venky. Venky survives, but he kidnaps Pooja and says he demands an apology, and Narasimha must fix all that he destroyed. Slowly, Pooja becomes friends with Venky, and after a little while they fall in love, but they don't know this. Pooja goes to her exam hall, and tells Venky she will tell him something after her exam. Pooja was going to say 'I love you'.

Meanwhile, Venky's friends and family explain the misunderstanding to Narasimha, and he immediately apologizes and fixes all the destruction he's caused. Pooja is not able to tell Venky her feelings because her brother comes and apologizes. Now Venky does not want to create any more problems, so he denies his love for Pooja. Pooja doesn't want to marry Ajay, but she accepts to make her brother happy. Ajay figures out that Pooja has been kidnapped and thinks that Venky and Pooja are in love. The Home Minister then insults Pooja. This leads to a fight and their wedding is called off. Narsimha thinks that Pooja should marry Venky, and they happily get married.

Cast

 Vishnu Manchu as Venky
 Taapsee Pannu as Pooja
 Prakash Raj as Narasimha
 Sayaji Shinde as Home Minister
 Jagapathi Babu as Jagapanthi
 Adivi Sesh as Sunny
 Ajay as Ajay
 Sanjay Reddy as Venky's brother
 Sudeepa Pinky as Venky's sister
 Gangadhar Panday as Principal
 Sonu Sood as Babji
 Murali Sharma as Babji's henchman
 Brahmanandam
 Tanikella Bharani
 Rama Prabha
 Pragathi
 Satya Krishnan
 Banerjee
 Jeeva
 Narsing Yadav
 Satyam Rajesh as Venky's friend
 Shiva Reddy as Siva
 Raghunatha Reddy

Soundtrack
Mani Sharma has composed the original score and soundtracks for the film. The audio was released on Mayuri Audio.

Political Rowdy (Tamil Version)

Reception
Idlebrain wrote "Plus points of the movie are interesting screenplay and entertainment in the second half. On the flip side, The director couldn’t get it right in the first half and climax. On a whole, Vastadu Naa Raju is a decent entertainer with commercial elements packed in it." 123Telugu wrote "Vasthaadu Naa Raju is a decent entertainer which traverses through love, action, sentiment and comedy. It’s predictable for most part but then a good effort on the whole". The film was dubbed in Tamil under the title Political Rowdy and was released on 17 October 2014. The film is dubbed as "Dare Devil" in Hindi.

References

External links
 

2011 films
2010s Telugu-language films
Films scored by Mani Sharma
Films directed by Hemant Madhukar